Max Johannes Whitta Fenger (born 7 August 2001) is a Danish professional footballer who plays as a forward or a winger for OB in the Danish Superliga.

Club career
Fenger started playing in the youth system at FC Roskilde, before signing with OB on 8 August 2018, after scoring 26 goals in a season in the U17 league for Roskilde. He initially became part of the under-19 team of OB.

He made his professional debut on 1 June 2020 in a 1–0 away loss to AGF, coming on as a substitute in the 47th minute for Mart Lieder. His first goal for the club came in the play-offs for European football, scoring in a 2–1 away loss to Randers FC on 11 July after making a start. In the return game, he secured advancement for OB by scoring a brace as the team won 2–0 at home. Fenger finished his first season in the first team with 10 appearances, in which he scored four goals – all in the play-offs for European football, which OB eventually lost out after a 1–0 loss to AGF.

Fenger struggled to find playing time the following season, as he was sidelined with a knee injury which he suffered in a loss to Brøndby IF on 8 November 2020. He made his comeback on 9 April 2021 in a 0–1 home loss to Vejle Boldklub as a late substitute.

Career statistics

References

2001 births
Living people
People from Roskilde
Danish men's footballers
Association football forwards
Danish Superliga players
FC Roskilde players
Odense Boldklub players
Sportspeople from Region Zealand